Swift crater is a crater on Mars's moon Deimos. Swift crater is named after Jonathan Swift, whose 1726 book Gulliver's Travels predicted the existence of two moons of Mars. Swift crater is one of two named features on Deimos, the other being Voltaire crater.

See also

 Voltaire (crater)
 Moons of Mars
 Phobos (moon)
 Deimos (moon)

References

Deimos (moon) 
Impact craters on Mars's moons
Jonathan Swift